The first season of the American television drama series True Blood premiered on September 7, 2008 and concluded on November 23, 2008. It consists of 12 episodes, each running approximately 55 minutes in length and was, for the most part, based on the novel Dead Until Dark, the first entry in The Southern Vampire Mysteries by Charlaine Harris. The story takes place in the fictional town of Bon Temps, Louisiana, two years after vampires have made their presence known to mankind, and follows telepathic waitress Sookie Stackhouse as she attempts to solve a series of murders that seem to be motivated by a hatred of vampires.

HBO broadcast the first season on Sunday nights at 9:00 pm in the United States, with a repeat showing at 11:00 pm. The complete first season was released on DVD and Blu-ray on May 19, 2009.

Plot
Sookie Stackhouse (Anna Paquin) is a waitress with telepathic abilities. Stephen Moyer plays her love interest, vampire Bill Compton. Sookie works for Sam Merlotte (Sam Trammell), owner of Merlotte's bar and a shapeshifter who has a crush on Sookie. Sookie's best friend Tara Thornton (Rutina Wesley) begins bartending at Merlotte's after quitting her job at the Super Save-A-Bunch. Also working at Merlotte's are Tara's cousin Lafayette Reynolds (Nelsan Ellis), a short order cook and hustler, and Arlene Fowler (Carrie Preston). Arlene is a thrice-divorced waitress with two children who, over the course of the season, becomes engaged to Rene Lenier (Michael Raymond-James), a Cajun labourer who works on a road crew.

Jason Stackhouse (Ryan Kwanten), Sookie's brother, is a labourer on a road crew and ladies' man. Jason's sexual relations begin to die, one after the other, and he is suspected of being a serial killer. Hoyt Fortenberry (Jim Parrack), Jason's co-worker, admires Jason's abilities with women.  Adele Stackhouse (Lois Smith) is Jason and Sookie's grandmother who has looked after them since the deaths of their parents. Jason's love interest Amy Burley (Lizzy Caplan) begins a relationship with Jason because  of a shared addiction to vampire blood, or "V". They kidnap Eddie Gauthier (Stephen Root), to use his blood.

In the vampire community, Eric Northman (Alexander Skarsgård) is the Sheriff of Area 5, which includes Bon Temps, and owner of the vampire bar Fangtasia. Working for Eric, both in the bar and under him as Sheriff, are Pam (Kristin Bauer) and Chow (Patrick Gallagher). The bartender Longshadow (Raoul Trujillo) is killed by Bill to protect Sookie. As punishment for killing a fellow vampire and to replenish the vampire ranks, Bill is taken to the Magister (Željko Ivanek) and forced to sire Jessica Hamby (Deborah Ann Woll). Jessica is cared for by Eric but when he grows tired of her he leaves her with Bill.

In the middle of the season Tara's mother, Lettie Mae (Adina Porter), undergoes an exorcism to rid herself of what she terms her "demons" - her addiction to alcohol. The exorcism is administered by "Miss Jeanette", an alias of Nancy LeGuare (Aisha Hinds). Following her exorcism Lettie Mae kicks Tara out. Following a crash and DUI, Tara is taken in by Maryann Forrester (Michelle Forbes), who initially presents herself to Tara as some kind of social worker. While staying with Maryann, Tara meets "Eggs" Benedict Talley (Mehcad Brooks) to whom she feels a strong attraction.

The central mystery of the season begins when Maudette Pickens (Danielle Sapia) is killed. Sheriff Dearborne (William Sanderson) places his only detective, Andy Bellefleur (Chris Bauer) in charge of finding the killer. Bellefleur suspects Jason Stackhouse, and that suspicion grows after the murder of Dawn Green (Lynn Collins). Andy's cousin Terry (Todd Lowe) works as a cook at Merlotte's.

The international conflict between vampires and humans is played out in the background, but two minor characters are introduced who become major characters in the second season: Reverend Steve Newlin (Michael McMillian) and his wife Sarah (Anna Camp). They head the anti-vampire church the Fellowship of the Sun following the death of Steve's father, who was supposedly killed by vampires. A representative of the Fellowship of the Sun approaches Jason Stackhouse while he is in jail in the final episode of the season.

Episodes

Cast and characters

Main cast

 Anna Paquin as Sookie Stackhouse
 Stephen Moyer as Bill Compton
 Sam Trammell as Sam Merlotte
 Ryan Kwanten as Jason Stackhouse
 Rutina Wesley as Tara Thornton
 Chris Bauer as Detective Andy Bellefleur
 Nelsan Ellis as Lafayette Reynolds
 Jim Parrack as Hoyt Fortenberry
 Adina Porter as Lettie Mae Thornton
 Carrie Preston as Arlene Fowler
 Michael Raymond-James as Rene Lenier
 William Sanderson as Sheriff Bud Dearborne
 Alexander Skarsgård as Eric Northman
 Lynn Collins as Dawn Green
 Lizzy Caplan as Amy Burley
 Lois Smith as Adele Stackhouse
 Stephen Root as Eddie Gauthier

Guest cast

 Todd Lowe as Terry Bellefleur
 Kristin Bauer van Straten as Pamela Swynford De Beaufort
 John Billingsley as Mike Spencer
 Alec Gray as Coby Fowler
 Aisha Hinds as Miss Jeanette
 Dale Raoul as Maxine Fortenberry
 Graham Shiels as Liam
 Raoul Trujillo as Longshadow
 Laurel Weber as Lisa Fowler
 Jeremy Denzlinger as Wayne
 Aunjanue Ellis as Diane
 Kanin Howell as Chuck
 Michelle Forbes as Maryann Forrester
 Danielle James as Randi Sue
 Michael McMillian as Reverend Steve Newlin
 Caleb Moody as Royce Williams
 John Prosky as David Finch
 Stacie Rippy as Cindy Marshall
 Andrew Rothenberg as Malcolm
 Danielle Sapia as Maudette Pickens
 Jessica Tuck as Nan Flanagan
 Deborah Ann Woll as Jessica Hamby
 Avion Baker as Young Tara
 Tara Buck as Ginger
 Patrick Gallagher as Chow
 Labon K. Hester as Young Jason
 Karina Logue as Denise Rattray
 Melanie MacQueen as Faye Lebvre
 Kevin McHale as Neil Jones
 Tess Alexandra Parker as Rosie
 James Jean Parks as Mack Rattray
 John Rezig as Deputy Kevin Ellis
 William Schallert as Sterling Norris
 Zenali Turner as Young Sookie
 Cheyenne Wilbur as Bartlett Hale
 Patricia Bethune as Jane Bodehouse
 Michael Bofshever as Orry Dawson
 Mehcad Brooks as "Eggs" Benedict Talley
 Željko Ivanek as Magnus the Magister
 Mariana Klaveno as Lorena Krasiki
 Adam Leadbeater as Karl
 Judy Prescott as Sue Ann Merlotte
 Stewart Skelton as Minister
 Martin Spanjers as Young Sam
 Sharon Tay as Sharon
 Tanya Wright as Deputy Kenya Jones

Production

Crew
Series creator Alan Ball had previously worked with premium cable channel HBO on Six Feet Under, which ran five seasons. In October 2005, after Six Feet Under'''s finale, Ball signed a two-year agreement with HBO to develop and produce original programming for the network. True Blood became the first project under the deal, after Ball became acquainted with Charlaine Harris' Southern Vampire Mystery books. One day, while early for a dentist appointment, Ball was browsing through Barnes & Noble and came across Dead Until Dark, the first installment in Harris' series. Enjoying it, he read the following entries and became interested in "bringing Harris' vision to television". However, Harris had two other adaptation options for the books when Ball approached her. He said she chose to work with him, though, because "[Ball] really 'got' me. That's how he convinced me to go with him. I just felt that he understood what I was doing with the books."

Ball wrote and directed the pilot episode, double Emmy winner Scott Winant, Red Rock West writer/director John Dahl, Heathers director Michael Lehmann, former Deadwood director Daniel Minahan, The Sopranos director Nick Gomez, Pretty Persuasion director Marcos Siega, The Wire director Anthony Hemingway and Six Feet Under co-producer Nancy Oliver directed subsequent episodes, with Ball directing the finale.

Nancy Oliver joined Ball as a producer, in the same role she had on Six Feet Under. Ball wrote the first three episodes with Brian Buckner, Alexander Woo, Raelle Tucker and Chris Offutt writing two episodes a piece, Nancy Oliver wrote and directed the eleventh episode, which marked her debut as a director. 

Buckner, Tucker and Woo were also credited as producers, Offutt was executive story editor for this season. Christina Jokanovich was an associate producer and Carol Dunn Trussell the line producer.

Reception
The first season of True Blood debuted at a very modest 1.44 million viewers compared to the network's past drama premiers such as Big Love which premiered at 4.56 million, and John from Cincinnati which debuted at 3.4 million. However, by late November 2008, 6.8 million a week were watching; this figure includes repeat and on-demand viewings. The season finale's viewership was 2.4 million. At the time, True Blood had reportedly become HBO's most popular series since The Sopranos and Sex and the City''.

Awards & nominations
The series won the Primetime Emmy Award for Outstanding Casting for a Drama Series. Anna Paquin won the Golden Globe Award for Best Actress in a Television series - Drama whilst the show was nominated for Best TV series - Drama. It also won best TV show, best horror actor for Stephen Moyer, Best Horror Actress for Anna Paquin & best villain for Alexander Skarsgård at the Scream Awards

Ratings

United Kingdom
All ratings are taken from the UK Ratings website, BARB.

Season 1 ending credits songs
Songs from the Season 1 ending credits in order by episode number. 
Little Big Town – "Bones"
Vallejo – "Snake in the Grass"
Charlie Robison – "Good Times"
Lynyrd Skynyrd – "That Smell"
Nathan Barr – "The Cabin"
Mark Seliger's Rusty Truck – "Cold Ground"
Cobra Verde – "Play with Fire"
Eagles of Death Metal – "I Want You So Hard"
Rufus Thomas – "Walking the Dog"
Dr. John – "I Don't Wanna Know about Evil"
Gillian Welch – "Pass You By"
Crooked Still – "Ain't No Grave"

References

External links 
 

True Blood
2008 American television seasons